was a Japanese astronomer noted for his contributions to celestial mechanics.

Life and work 

Hagihara graduated from Tokyo Imperial University with a degree in astronomy in 1921 and became an assistant professor of astronomy there two years later. In 1923 the Japanese government sent him abroad as a traveling scholar. Hagihara went to Cambridge University in England to study differential equations under the mathematician Henry Frederick Baker and relativity alongside Paul Dirac under the astrophysicist Sir Arthur Stanley Eddington. He was a visiting scholar in France, Germany, and the United States.

He returned to Japan in 1925 but left for the United States three years later to study the topology of dynamical systems at Harvard University under George David Birkhoff on a Rockefeller Foundation Fellowship.

Hagihara finished his studies at Harvard in 1929 and returned again to the University of Tokyo, where, in 1930, he completed a D.Sc. dissertation on the stability of satellite systems. In 1935, he published a paper showing that the trajectory of a test particle in the Schwarzschild metric can be expressed in terms of elliptic functions. For more than a decade after 1937, he investigated the distribution of electron velocities in planetary nebulae.

He was promoted to full professor at the University of Tokyo in 1935. From 1945 to 1957 he was the director of the Tokyo Astronomical Observatory and subsequently was a professor at Tohoku University (1957–1960) and president of Utsunomiya University (1961–1967). In 1961 he was elected vice-president of the International Astronomical Union and president of the IAU's commission on celestial mechanics.

He retired from all of his official duties, except for the Japan Academy, in 1967 and devoted himself to writing his comprehensive five volume work, Celestial Mechanics, which was based on his lecture notes.

Hagihara was regarded as a quiet and cultured gentleman, an excellent teacher and a capable administrator.

He has pointed out the importance of the post-Newton models for celestial mechanics, namely that developed by Georgi Manev.

Honors 
 The main-belt asteroid 1971 Hagihara was named in his honor.
 Fellow of the Royal Astronomical Society
 Chairman of the National Committee of Astronomy (Japan)
 Member Japan Academy
 Member Science Council of Japan
 Order of Cultural Merit (Japan)
 Recipient of the James Craig Watson Medal from the U.S. National Academy of Science (1960)

Works

See also 

 Schwarzschild geodesics
 List of contributors to general relativity

References 
 

 

1897 births
1979 deaths
University of Paris alumni
Harvard University alumni
Academic staff of the University of Tokyo
Recipients of the Order of Culture
Recipients of the Order of the Sacred Treasure, 1st class
20th-century Japanese astronomers
People from Osaka
Academic staff of Tohoku University